Joe Sweeney (born November 8, 1993) is a New Hampshire State Representative, elected in 2012.  He is a Republican from Salem, representing Rockingham District 08. He is also currently Executive Director of the New Hampshire Republican State Committee.

References

External links

Living people
1993 births
Republican Party members of the New Hampshire House of Representatives